Planet Word is a language arts museum that opened in Washington, D.C., in October 2020. The museum is described as "The museum where language comes to life" and features interactive exhibits dedicated to topics such as the history of the English Language, how children learn words, languages around the world, humor, poetry, and how music and advertising use words. It is located in the historic Franklin School building, designed by Adolf Cluss, located on Franklin Square at 13th and K Street.

The museum was created by Ann B. Friedman, a philanthropist and former reading teacher who is married to  New York Times opinion columnist Tom Friedman. 

Initial building renovation began in 2017. In 2018, work on the project was stopped after it was discovered that D.C. and U.S. federal preservation rules were violated in the destruction of the building's interior.  A "minimal" fine was paid, work on the project continued, and the museum opened on October 22, 2020.

Each exhibit focuses on a different aspect of spoken and/or signed language, with an emphasis on allowing visitors to speak or sign, manipulate, and interact with concepts. This ranges from an elaborate interactive room-sized globe to playful poetry written on bathroom walls.

Speaking Willow, an interactive, motion-detecting tree sculpture, is an exhibit created by Rafael Lozano-Hemmer that whispers to visitors in hundreds of different languages as they enter the museum. This interactive sculpture was delivered by Public Art Fund in collaboration of art foundry, UAP. 

Other notable exhibits within the museum include First Words, Where Do Words Come From?, and The Spoken Word. In March 2022, Planet Word opened Lexicon Lane, a permanent exhibit where visitors can solve language-related “cases”. Located on the third floor of the museum, the exhibit is set up to look like a small village, within which visitor have an hour to solve a mystery by figuring out the answers to language-related puzzles and riddles. 

Cintas Corporation selected Planet Word as a finalist for the 2021 America’s Best Restroom Contest.

In May 2022, the North American School Scrabble Championship was held live at Planet Word.  Walden Giezentanner, a seventh grader, and sixth grader Nathaniel Campos were winners.

References

External links

Museums established in 2020
History museums in Washington, D.C.
2020 establishments in Washington, D.C.
Language museums
Art museums and galleries in Washington, D.C.
Northwest (Washington, D.C.)
National Historic Landmarks in Washington, D.C.